Two on the Road, also known as Fearless Dragons and The Fearless Jackal, is a 1980 Hong Kong martial arts film directed by Lei Chiu and starring Bryan Leung, Philip Ko and Wang Lung-wei.

Plot
During the early years of the Republic of China era, Ming On Town's mayor, Tse Hung (Wang Lung-wei), raises a large sum of funds for disaster victims of Guangdong with renowned martial arts master Wong and his disciples in charge of transporting the funds up north. However, while on the road, the funds were hijacked by robbers, causing disorderly chaos. Lively Dragon (Bryan Leung), a conman, sees a wanted notice posted and reports it to the yamen leading police captain Yung and Master Wong to arrest wanted criminal Crazy Horse (Philip Ko). However, Horse managed to escape and as a result, Dragon was unable to collect any bounty. Dragon also becomes wanted with Horse and were both captured and jailed. Fortunately, they worked together to escape from prison and became friends. Dragon and Horse later discover that someone set a trap causing them to become suspects for the stolen funds and the duo collaborates to investigate into the matter. Since then, a series of strange events occur in Ming On Town and Chow Po, the Tse family's housekeeper was killed when his wealth was made visible and Captain Yung was killed by the same culprit. Although Dragon and Horse's lives were in danger, they continued to investigate. Soon they discovered the secret that the funds were taken by an unexpected person. The duo decides to engage in a thrilling battle of wits and fists with the culprit to bring him to justice once and for all.

Cast
Bryan Leung as Lively Dragon (雷震天)
Philip Ko as Crazy Horse (馬力)
Wang Lung-wei as Tse Hung (謝雄)
Leung Ka-lai as Master Wong (黃師傅)
Siu Kam as Golden Teeth (大金牙)
Chan Lau
Addy Sung
Chiang Tao
Sai Gwa-Pau as Buckteeth So (牙擦蘇)
Cheung Chok-chow
Tsui Oi-sam
Chow Shing-po
Tsang Chiu-yue
Liu Chui-yi as Female prisoner
Chiu Sing-po
Wong Hak
Ho Pak-kwong
Lai Kim-hung
Chong Wai
Chan Leung
Lei Chiu
Ho Kei-cheong
Cheung Ping-chan
To Wai-wo
Lee Fat-yuen
Chan Ling-wai
Tai San

Box office
The film grossed HK$912,068.50 at the Hong Kong box office during its theatrical run from 6 to 12 November 1980.

References

External links

Two on the Road at Hong Kong Cinemagic

1980 films
1980s action comedy films
1980s buddy films
1980 martial arts films
Buddy comedy films
1980s Cantonese-language films
Films about miscarriage of justice
Films set in the Republic of China (1912–1949)
Films shot in Hong Kong
Hong Kong action comedy films
Hong Kong buddy films
Hong Kong martial arts films
Martial arts comedy films
Kung fu films
1980 comedy films
1980s Hong Kong films